Virginia North, Lady White (24 April 1946 – 5 June 2004) was an Anglo-American actress who appeared in small roles in five films and one TV programme between 1967 and 1971.

Life and career
Born Virginia Anne Northrop in London to a British mother and a U.S. Army father, North spent her early years in Britain, France, Southeast Asia and finally Washington, following her father's military postings. By the mid-1960s she had returned to Britain, where she worked as a  model, specialising in swim wear. In 1968, she joined the newly established London agency Models 1, which has since gone on to become one of the major modelling agencies in Europe. 
 
North began her brief film career with small parts in the Bulldog Drummond film Deadlier Than the Male (1967) and the Yul Brynner vehicle The Long Duel (1967). She returned to film two years later as Robot Number Nine in Some Girls Do (1969), the second in the Bulldog Drummond franchise, and as Olympe in two short scenes in the James Bond film On Her Majesty's Secret Service (1969).
 
The 1969 Department S episode "The Mysterious Man in the Flying Machine" marked her only television appearance. 
 
Her last and perhaps best-known role was as Vincent Price's silent assistant, Vulnavia, in the horror comedy The Abominable Dr. Phibes (1971).

Personal life 
In 1974, North married a wealthy industrialist Gordon White.  Later that year, she gave birth to their only child, Lucas. 
 
When her husband was awarded a KBE in 1979 for services to British industry, becoming Sir Gordon White, Virginia White became Virginia, Lady White. She and White were divorced in 1991. She never remarried and died at her home in West Sussex, England, in June 2004, after a two-year battle with cancer.

Filmography

References

External links
 

English film actresses
English television actresses
English people of American descent
Actresses from London
Spouses of life peers
1946 births
2004 deaths